Jared Raab is a Canadian writer and filmmaker, best known for his work on the television series Nirvanna the Band the Show.

Originally from Millbrook, Ontario, Raab studied film at York University. He made a number of short films before breaking through to wider attention with his 2011 short The Revenge Plot, which won the Fan Favorite award at the 2011 RBC Emerging Filmmakers Competition. For a number of years thereafter he was a director of music videos for artists such as Born Ruffians, Arkells, Ohbijou, Diamond Rings, PS I Love You, Snailhouse, Young Rival and Fast Romantics. He received two Prism Prize nominations as a director of music videos, in 2017 for July Talk's "Picturing Love" and in 2021 for Andy Shauf's "Clove Cigarette".

He was cinematographer on Matt Johnson's films The Dirties and Operation Avalanche prior to Johnson and Jay McCarrol creating Nirvanna the Band the Show, for which Raab was both a cinematographer and one of the writers.

He is a two-time Canadian Screen Award nominee for Best Writing in a Comedy Series for Nirvanna the Band the Show, receiving nods at the 6th Canadian Screen Awards in 2018 for "The Bean" and at the 7th Canadian Screen Awards in 2019 for "The Book", and a nominee for Best Direction in a Documentary Series at the 10th Canadian Screen Awards in 2022 for This Is Pop.

References

External links

21st-century Canadian screenwriters
21st-century Canadian male writers
Canadian male screenwriters
Canadian cinematographers
Canadian music video directors
Canadian television writers
Film directors from Ontario
People from Peterborough County
York University alumni
Living people
Year of birth missing (living people)